Anatoliy Nasiedkin (Russian: Анотолий Леонидович Наседкин; Ukrainian: Анатолій Леонідович Насєдкін); 22 April 1924, in Veliky Novgorod – 26 July 1994, in Kharkiv) was a Soviet Ukrainian painter. He graduated from the Kharkiv Institute of Arts in 1951. His teacher was Mykhail Deregus. In 1985 was awarded the Shevchenko National Prize.

The roots of his art come from Russian and Ukrainian culture that cannot be divided by state borders. He was born in the ancient Russian lands of Veliky Novgorod, and almost all his life he spent in Ukraine, in Kharkiv. Anatoly Nasedkin absorbed his childish love for his native countryside, green meadows and birch woods, winding shores of the Lake Ilmen and the River Seversky Donets.

"Happiness is when people understand you, when you realize that your work is consonant with the time ..." (A.L. Nasedkin)

Biography

Childhood 

Anatoly Leonidovich Nasedkin was born in Veliky Novgorod in 1924. His parents Leonid Efimovich and Nina Petrovna Nasedkin had four children: the eldest son – Valentine, twins Lena (she died in the age of 3) and Olga, the youngest – Anatoly.

Anatoly's grandfather had a great influence on the formation of a future artist. He came from a sort of merchants. But he was known throughout the city as a good engineer and mechanic, he was well educated, knew four foreign languages, had a rich home library. Despite his harsh nature he was trying to give a sense of love for literature and knowledge to his children and grandchildren. In the grandfather's library small Anatoly took his pencil and paper for the first time to re-draw pictures from books.

From an early age he loved everything that was connected with ancient Novgorod, where he lived until the age of six before moving to Kharkiv. «...My discovery of the world took place on the Volga. While my further biography was related to Kharkiv, where the family moved in the early thirties» - Anatoly Nasedkin said later.

Youth 

In the early thirties the economic crisis took place in the country. Looking for work in 1934 Leonid Nasedkin went to Kharkiv and soon he called there his family.

Anatoliy studied in men's gymnasium. Most he liked history and literature. Youthful love to Gorky's works, Shevchenko's poetry, books written by G. Skovoroda and I. Franko manifested in a series of paintings, engravings and lithographs devoted to these great writers and their works in his adulthood. We know such works as «Seeing Gorky off Nizhniy Novgorod», «M.Gorky at the grave of Taras Shevchenko», «Gorky and Stasov in the Repin’s studio», «Franko sheltering the persecuted peasants», etc. But most of all in his youth Anatoly liked to draw. He drew every free moment, sometimes he even ran away from school to the forest or to the river in order to draw something from nature.

And there was one more passion – Kharkiv Art Museum. Anatoliy Nasedkin could walk by the halls of the museum all day long, could stand for hours in front of paintings of Bryullov, Aivazovsky, Shishkin, Ge, Korovin, Surikov. In the early 30s great works of I. Repin were added to the Museum's collection. These were «Reply of the Zaporozhian Cossacks» and «Cossack in steppe». They became one of the most beloved by the future artist. Later Nasedkin always considered himself to be a follower of the Russian classical art of Repin and Stasov.

In his 12 Anatoly Nasedkin entered the Art studio in the Palace of Pioneers in Kharkiv. He walked there on foot through the whole city two times a week. This art studio became his first professional school of painting. Many exhibitions took place there. One was dedicated to the Papanintsi – the first Soviet people in the North Pole. The legendary «polar people» Papanin and Krenkel came to the Palace of Pioneers. Inspired by this meeting Anatoly Nasedkin drew a picture «Papanintsi», which was published in the anthology «Schasliva yunist» in 1938. After that it was presented in the VDNKh exhibition in Moscow, where Anatoly was awarded a Certificate of VDNKh USSR. This was the first recognition of his artistic creativity. «Palace of Pioneers played a decisive role in my life, in choosing my profession. In the Palace of Pioneers I met the Art and fell in love with it for all my life», – said the painter.

Soon his father died. Nina Petrovna had to raise her children alone. She sewed working at home. Anatoly had just finished the 9th grade; his drawings were marked by the well-known artists of Kharkiv. But war began.

In summer of 1941 the Nasedkin family saw off Valentine (Anatoly's elder brother) to the front, but after a few months they received a notice that Valentine was missing.

In 1943 Kharkiv was released, and Anatoliy Nasedkin joined the army as a volunteer. In the Orel-Kursk direction battles Anatoliy got a seriously wound. Long months in field hospital and then in hospitals of Tula, Moscow, Sverdlovsk passed. Only in 1945 he finally came back to life. A medal «For Valour», which he received during that fight when he was seriously wounded, was the dearest of all the awards.

Work 

Even at the front Nasedkin never parted with his album and pencil. When he returned to Kharkiv, he continued to improve his painting. In 1946 Anatoly entered the Kharkiv Art Institute, where he was taught by famous masters M.G. Deregus and H.E. Svetlichny. There he became a professional artist. After graduating in 1951 Anatoly Nasedkin got a specialization of panel painter.

In 1957 Anatoly Leonidovich met Irina Igorevna Tikhova. In 1958 they got married. And in 1961 their daughter Victoria was born. Irina had to stop working. She devoted all her life to her husband and her family.

The work of young painter Anatoly Nasedkin was «under the sign» of A.M. Gorky. Nasedkin studied Gorky's wanderings routes, held in his footsteps along the rivers Vetluga and Kerzhenets, visited the Middle Volga. He painted landscapes, made sketches for future paintings. As a result, we know such works as «Seeing Gorky off Nizhny Novgorod in 1901», 1955 (this painting was purchased for the permanent exhibition by the Central Gorky's museum in Moscow); «Song of the working gang», 1957; «M. Gorky at the grave of Taras Shevchenko», 1961 (it is stored in the T.G. Shevchenko's museum in Kanev); «M. Gorky and F. Chaliapin», etc.

The history was not the only interest of Anatoly Nasedkin. The great events of our time and people who commit them excited him no less. In spring and summer of 1961 he painted a vivid canvas of meeting Yuri Gagarin who had returned from the first space flight. The picture shows how jubilant people warmly welcome the hero and his glorious deed. This work was presented at the Republican exhibition in Kiev, and then at the All-Union Exhibition in Moscow.

In the 1960s pictures on the historical and revolutionary themes took the most important place in the Ukrainian art. Anatoly Nasedkin began working on the theme of the first years of Soviet power. Three paintings – «To Kolkhoz!» (1960), «Bread of Revolution» (1965), «Food Squad (Requisition)» (1967) – became a kind of triptych.

In 1968 the work «Food Squad (Requisition)» appeared on the all-union and republican exhibitions. Anatoly Nasedkin received the title of Honoured Artist. For the works about the village Anatoly Nasedkin was awarded by the Shevchenko National Prize in 1985.
Many years passed before Nasedkin felt himself able to create a work devoted to the military theme – the painting «No land Beyond the Volga» (1975). «In «No Land Beyond the Volga» I showed a soldier of Stalingrad. For a long time I was searching for a person that could reflect heroic traits of all the people who won the mortal combat» – he said.

In 1975 the artist decided to talk about himself on the canvas. «Self Portrait» written in this year is the image of a man – the creator, shown in a moment of deep reflection. The artist chose a very simple sitting position, modest, quiet, neutral grey-blue with a black shade of colourful range, which would harmonize with his psychological condition.

In general the genre of the portrait attracted the artist no less than easel painting. In the family archive there is a set of portraits of peasants, workers, students, friends of the artist. Portraits of A.L. Nasedkin's family members (portraits of his mother, sister and niece, his wife and daughter, son-in-law and granddaughters) take particular place. They constitute a unique pedigree.

In 1976 in Kharkiv and then in Kiev a successful exhibition of A.L. Nasedkin's works took place. It became a kind of summary of his twenty-five years' work. He was recognized as one of the best representatives of the Kharkiv art school.

Since the early 1970s and to the end of his life A.L. Nasedkin was fond of still lives and landscapes. He liked to convey freshness and beauty of a just collected bouquet of wildflowers, or a momentary state of nature, or the dynamics of motion, colour and composition which characterized the spirit of time. In some landscapes you can even «read» the history of some Kharkiv's streets where the artist lived: «The road to Shatilovka» (1958), «Construction of the pool «Pioneer» (1970), «First Snow» (1971), «View of the Lenin Street» (1981), «View of the Kolomenskaya Street» (1982).

In the early 1990s he returned to the theme of Shevchenko again. The artist began several large-scale canvases dedicated to the great Kobzar making many sketches. Many invitations to the new exhibitions came from England, France and Japan in the late 80s and early 1990s. Having celebrated his 70-year anniversary the artist was full of energy and plans. But on 26 July 1994 Anatoly Leonidovich Nasedkin died.

His works 
 To kolkhoz (1960)
 Bred of Revolution (1965)
 Food Squad (Requisition) (1967)

References

External links 
 Official site of the Painter
 https://www.webcitation.org/6At70e5vl?url=http://artru.info/ar/19347/
 Artists trade union of Russia: The Register of Artists

Soviet artists
20th-century Russian painters
Russian male painters
Ukrainian painters
Ukrainian male painters
1994 deaths
1924 births
People from Veliky Novgorod
Recipients of the Shevchenko National Prize
Kharkiv State Academy of Design and Arts alumni
20th-century Russian male artists